The rolling stock preserved on the South Devon Railway is used to operate passenger services on the railway and for its maintenance. Other items are displayed for their historic interest or are awaiting restoration.

The South Devon Railway (SDR) is a  heritage railway in Devon, England. It was sold to the non-profit South Devon Railway Trust in 1991.

The SDR's collection includes many examples of steam locomotives typical of Great Western Railway types that used to work in Devon, also other types of steam locomotives and a number of diesel locomotives. The most notable locomotive on display is Tiny, a South Devon Railway 0-4-0vb shunting locomotive which is in the museum at Buckfastleigh station. This is the only original  broad gauge locomotive still in existence in the United Kingdom.

There are a number of historic coaches in use including two 'GWR Super Saloons' coaches once used for trans-Atlantic liner passengers, and several auto coaches that were used on small branch lines such as this.

The engine sheds and workshops are at Buckfastleigh.

Locomotives

Steam locomotives
Many of the steam locomotives operating on the South Devon Railway are Great Western Railway (GWR) designs which would have worked on the line and nearby. There are also several locomotives from industrial facilities such as quarries and gas works, including some from locations in Devon.

Non-standard gauge steam
These locomotives are on display at Buckfastleigh.

Diesel locomotives

Diesel Multiple Units

Coaching stock
Passenger coaches on the South Devon Railway are mostly Great Western Railway (GWR) or British Railways (BR) designs.

Goods wagons
Heritage goods wagons on the South Devon Railway include many examples from the Great Western Railway (GWR) and British Rail (BR) along with some from other companies. Specialised wagons are used by the Permanent Way Department and others to maintain the railway and its equipment.

Narrow gauge

Past members of the SDR fleet
Locomotives and multiple units which have been based on the South Devon Railway in the past. These lists do not include locomotives based on other lines that were short term visitors, for example to a gala weekend or for a season.

Steam

Diesel

References

External links

South Devon Railway - Locomotives and rolling stock
Devon Diesel Society
South Devon Diesel Traction

Lists of locomotives and rolling stock preserved on heritage railways in England
Rail transport in Devon
South Devon Railway